Murviel-lès-Béziers (literally Murviel near Béziers) is a commune in the Hérault department in the Occitanie region in southern France.

Geography

Climate
Murviel-lès-Béziers has a mediterranean climate (Köppen climate classification Csa).

Population

See also
Communes of the Hérault department

References

Communes of Hérault